Argonaut Peak is a tall mountain in the Cascade Range in the U.S. state of Washington. Part of the Stuart Range part of the Wenatchee subrange of the Cascades, it is within the Alpine Lakes Wilderness of the Wenatchee National Forest and part of the region known as The Enchantments. At  in elevation it is the 65th highest peak in Washington. Located on the crest between Colchuck Peak and Sherpa Peak, Argonaut Peak has a southeast and a west summit of almost identical height, with the west being the true summit. There is a prominent southeast spire. Its southern side slopes down to the valley of Ingalls Creek. The north and northeast sides of Argonaut stand high above a branch of Mountaineer Creek, a tributary of Icicle Creek.

Geology
Argonaut Peak is a large bastion of clean granite rock, part of the Mount Stuart batholith.

History
Argonaut Peak was first summited, via the south route, in September 1955 by Lex Maxwell, Bob McCall, and Bill Prater.

See also
List of mountains of the United States
List of mountains by elevation

References

Mountains of Washington (state)
Cascade Range
Mountains of Chelan County, Washington